In 1952, Billboard magazine published three charts covering the best-performing country music songs in the United States.  At the start of the year, the charts were published under the titles Most-Played Juke Box (Country & Western) Records, Best-Selling Retail Folk (Country & Western) Records and Country & Western Records Most Played By Folk Disk Jockeys.  Beginning with the issue of Billboard dated November 15, the titles of the charts were changed to Most Played in Juke Boxes, National Best Sellers, and Most Played By Jockeys respectively, with the genre denoted in an overall page title rather than within the titles of the charts themselves.  All three charts are considered part of the lineage of the multimetric Hot Country Songs chart, which was first published in 1958.

In the first issue of Billboard of the year, "Slow Poke" by Pee Wee King retained its place at number one on both the juke box and retail charts from the previous week but was displaced from the top spot on the jockeys chart by Carl Smith's "Let Old Mother Nature Have Her Way".  Smith had three number-one country songs in 1952, two of which topped all three listings.  Webb Pierce was the only other artist to take as many as three different songs to the top spot in 1952, although none of his songs reached number one on all three charts during the year.  The longest-running number one on both the juke box and retail charts was "The Wild Side of Life" by Hank Thompson, which on both listings  spent fifteen consecutive weeks in the top spot before being replaced by "It Wasn't God Who Made Honky Tonk Angels" by Kitty Wells.  Wells' song, which had been written as an answer song to "The Wild Side of Life", was the first million-selling country single by a female artist and the first Billboard country number one by a solo female.  Despite this success, it did not top the jockeys chart, as the song's lyrics were deemed too controversial by some radio stations.

The longest-running number one on the jockeys chart was "Jambalaya (On the Bayou)" by Hank Williams, which spent thirteen non-consecutive weeks atop the chart.   The Cajun-inspired song was the final number one of the year on both that chart and the retail listing and was thus in the top spot when Williams died early on January 1, 1953.  The year's final number one on the juke box chart was "Don't Let the Stars Get in Your Eyes" by Skeets McDonald, which reached the peak position in the issue of Billboard dated December 27.  McDonald's version of the song reached the top spot three weeks after its writer, Slim Willet, had taken his own recording of the track to number one on the jockeys chart.  The song would prove to be the only country number one for both McDonald and Willet and both had only short chart careers; in Willet's case it was his only charting song.  In contrast, the three other singers who reached number one for the first time in 1952 would go on to achieve further chart-toppers and be elected into the Country Music Hall of Fame in recognition of their long and successful careers.  Hank Thompson and Kitty Wells each gained the first of three number ones in 1952 and remained top 10 regulars until the late 1960s.  Webb Pierce topped the jockeys chart in March with "Wondering", his first charting song.  It was the first of 12 number ones which the singer gained in less than four years, and he achieved more than 80 top 40 entries during his career.

Chart history

See also
1952 in country music
List of artists who reached number one on the U.S. country chart

References

1952
Country
1952 record charts